A Fine Night for Dying is a 1969 novel by Jack Higgins originally published under the pseudonym Martin J Fallon. Set on the high seas, it is a new adventure for super-spy Paul Chavasse.

Plot summary
Weighted down by chain, the body of gangland boss Harvey Preston is dragged out of the English Channel in a fisherman's net. British Intelligence suspects a connection with a minor cross-channel smuggling ring, and sends dogged undercover agent Paul Chavasse to find answers.

Chavasse soon discovers that this is no small-time operation; it reaches throughout the world and leads to the doors of some very ruthless and powerful men. Men who aren't about to let Chavasse interfere with the delivery of their precious cargo...

References in other works
The character Harvey Preston shares his name with another character who would feature in The Eagle Has Landed. This version of Preston, however, was a member of the British Free Corps and was attached to a paratroop unit sent to assassinate Winston Churchill. Both characters, however, are portrayed as dislikable characters who are despised by all around them.

1969 British novels
Novels by Jack Higgins
Works published under a pseudonym
Novels set on ships
John Long Ltd books